Oxydema fusiforme, commonly known as citrus flower beetle, is a species of weevil widely distributed in Indo-Pacific islands such as Sri Lanka, the Seychelles, Rodriguez Island, the Marquesas Islands, the Samoan Islands, the Hawaiian Islands, Guam Island, and Marcus Island.

Biology
Adult beetles are collected from a rotten log of Tournefortia argentea. The other host plants include, Aleurites moluccana and Pandanus odorifer. It is also an intermediate host of the nematode, Cheilospirura hamulosa.

References 

Curculionidae
Insects of Sri Lanka
Beetles described in 1873